Aeromonas infections include skin infections such as cellulitis, pustules, and furuncles. Aeromonas species can also cause gastroenteritis.

Aeromonas infections can sometimes be spread by leech bites.

See also 
 Aeromonas
 Chromobacteriosis infection
 Skin lesion

References 

Bacterium-related cutaneous conditions